The 1993 Auto Trader RAC British Touring Car Championship season was 36th British Touring Car Championship (BTCC) season.

Season summary
At the end of 1992 BMW GB withdrew from the championship after the rules had been changed in a direction which BMW felt disadvantaged them. Prodrive, which had run the works operation for BMW, had been expected to be entering a works Mercedes Benz team in cooperation with AMG, running the C-class. Prodrive stalwart Tim Sugden and Bernd Schneider were due to drive for the team. The plans were for a late season appearance leading to a full challenge in 1994, but this eventually came to nothing. Vic Lee Motorsport was liquidated after owner Vic Lee's drug scandal. The assets of the team were taken over by Steve Neal and Ray Bellm, who picked up personnel from Euroracing's discontinued sports car effort and merged it into Neal's Rimstock Racing outfit, creating Team Dynamics. Bellm would sell his share in the team later in the year, leaving Steve Neal as the only owner. The team started the 1993 season with three 1992-spec 318iS cars piloted by Matt Neal, Ray Bellm and Alex Portman, later dropping down to two. 
Only weeks after BMW GB withdrew from the BTCC, BMW withdrew their Schnitzer Motorsport-run works operation from the German DTM championship, also there because of their disagreement with new rules. With few other series to contest in Schnitzer Motorsport were sent over by BMW to the British championship along with works drivers Steve Soper and Joachim Winkelhock. 
Andy Rouse had lost his Toyota contract to famous Toyota tuners TOM'S Norfolk-based European arm known as Tom's GB, who had previously run Group A Toyotas in BTCC in the eighties. Andy Rouse's seat was taken over by Julian Bailey, and the new shape Carina E GTi replaced the older model. Toyota also supported a junior team run by Park Lane Racing, who would run two older shape Carinas for James Kaye and Bobby Verdon-Roe. Rouse himself had landed a Ford works deal, but the new Mondeo would not appear until after the season had started. 
Vauxhall retained their John Cleland / Jeff Allam line-up in the Vauxhall Cavalier and their Ecurie Ecosse semi-works team; at Ecurie Ecosse David Leslie retained his seat and was after a few races joined by fellow Scotsman Harry Nuttall. Peugeot added Eugene O’Brien and Ian Flux to Robb Gravett for a three-car line-up in the Peugeot 405 Mi16 (with Flux’ car being run by Roy Kennedy Racing); Nissan ran three cars for Keith O'Dor, Win Percy and Tiff Needell, and Mazda returned with Patrick Watts in a brand new Xedos 6. Renault was the new manufacturer to join the championship with Alain Menu and reigning champion Tim Harvey as their drivers in the Renault 19 16v

The season started at Silverstone, where Steve Soper led team-mate Joachim Winkelhock home for a dominating BMW one-two. The second round at Donington Park was the support race for the European Grand Prix. The race was hit by torrential rain, and thanks to Michelin (whose wet-weather tyres were far superior to the ones of the other tire manufacturers) Renault was able to claim a one-two finish, Tim Harvey winning the race ahead of Alain Menu. It soon became apparent that Renault's pace was tied to conditions, as they struggled to match the championship's privateers in the dry.

A start line crash at the next round at Snetterton forced a red flag, and five cars failed to make the restart. The race would be won by Soper, with Julian Bailey in second and David Leslie in third. Winkelhock then took the victory at Round 4 at Donington Park ahead of Jeff Allam and Steve Soper. Winkelhock then took a commanding victory at Oulton Park, and as Steve Soper had gone off into a tyre wall and forced into retirement Winkelhock now took the championship lead by two points.

Brands Hatch hosted the first double header of the season. Winkelhock was at the centre of controversy when he shunted David Leslie out of the lead to take the win. Keith O’Dor finished second and Will Hoy third. Leslie was not amused, commenting that Winkelhock had not had any opportunity whatsoever to pull the pass off. Winkelhock apologized, saying he was a lot faster than Leslie in that corner but that there had been a bit of a misunderstanding when he tried his move. Winkelhock then led the second race when he made a mistake going into Clearways and went off into the Armco barrier and retirement. Will Hoy then went off at the same place, but ended up a bit further to the right and into the tires that covered some of the barriers at that corner. With both of his major contenders out Soper could take an easy win ahead of O’Dor and Jeff Allam.

The BTCC then headed to Wales for Round 8 at Pembrey, where Ford made its debut. Winkelhock won the race with Hoy in second and Soper in third. At the next round at Silverstone Toyota appeared to be heading home a one-two finish for Will Hoy and Julian Bailey. An over-ambitious move from Bailey however put Hoy on his roof and forced Bailey himself into retirement. It was instead Keith O’Dor who took his and Nissan's first BTCC victory. To make it a perfect day for Nissan his teammate Win Percy finished second in a drag race over the line with Paul Radisich, who took the returning Ford team's first podium.

Knockhill held the next double header of the season. A race long battle between Vauxhall driver John Cleland and Toyota driver Julian Bailey saw Cleland finally come out on top, with Will Hoy finishing in third. Further back, Soper lost valuable points when he was pushed off by Radisich in the Ford. Luckily for him Winkelhock was not able to start the second race due to clutch problems. It was now Bailey's turn to win a race, finishing ahead of Cleland and Hoy. The Renault team decided to skip the Scottish meeting and focus on developing their car.

Oulton Park hosted Round 12 which was the Gold Cup, and Renault's car updates appeared to have paid off. Both cars qualified and finished much better than before, Menu taking fourth. Up front Winkelhock led from start to finish while Soper was second ahead of Cleland. 
Round 13 took place at Brands Hatch and Winkelhock and Leslie clashed again. First Winkelhock barged past Leslie to take second, and when Leslie attempted to retake the place he pushed Winkelhock into a spin. Both drivers dropped down the field while Radisich won the race from Soper and Peugeot driver Robb Gravett; Soper was however later penalised one position because of his rather forceful move on Gravett on the last lap to take second.

Leslie then finally won a race when the series visited Thruxton. Ford was second and third with Radisich and Andy Rouse, while a sixth place from Soper closed the gap between him and Winkelhock to twelve points.

Donington Park hosted the penultimate weekend of the championship and the last double header meeting. Radisich dominated the first race and won it by more than ten seconds, while wet weather conditions enabled Renault to finish second and third. A puncture had forced Soper to retire, and with Winkelhock finishing fifth the German now had the chance to take the title in the second race. Menu then won Race 2 from Radisich and Winkelhock, but as Soper finished fifth the championship would be decided in the final round at Silverstone.

At Silverstone the race was red flagged following an accident involving Robb Gravett's Peugeot. Will Hoy led away in the Toyota after the restart, but was later passed by both Paul Radisich and Andy Rouse, who took a one-two finish for Ford. Hoy held on to third, and while Steve Soper finished ahead of Winkelhock he did not get the result he needed and it was Joachim Winkelhock who won the 1993 British Touring Car Championship. Despite missing the first part of the season Paul Radisich finished third in the championship, with John Cleland in fourth and Julian Bailey in fifth.

Teams and drivers

TOCA Shootout

Entrants

Results

Race calendar and winners
All races were held in the United Kingdom.

Championship results

Drivers Championship

Note: bold signifies pole position, italics signifies fastest lap.

TOCA Challenge for Privateers

Manufacturers Championship

References

External links
 Full championship results

1993 Season
Touring Car Championship Season